Sir Arthur Probyn Jones, 2nd Baronet (28 July 1892 – 17 October 1951), was a British barrister, baronet and Liberal Party politician.

Background
Jones was the only son of surgeon Sir Robert Jones, 1st Baronet, and Susie Evans of Liverpool. He was educated at Clifton College (Exhibitioner) and King's College, Cambridge where in 1913 he graduated, receiving a Bachelor of Arts LLB (Honours) and in 1918 a Master of Arts. His education had been interrupted by the 1914-18 war, during which he served with the King's Regiment (Liverpool), reaching the rank of captain. In 1919 he married Eileen Evans of Birkdale. They had one daughter. In 1933 he inherited his father's baronetcy and became known as Sir Arthur Probyn-Jones. On his death in 1951 the baronetcy became extinct.

Professional career
In 1919, having qualified as a barrister Jones received a Call to the bar by the Inner Temple. He practised on the Northern Circuit. From 1939-45 he was employed in the legal department of the Ministry of Food at Tunbridge Wells. He was Chairman of the Medical Appeals Tribunal for the North Midland Region and Deputy Chairman of the National Health Service Tribunal. In addition to living in London he bought a property in Bexhill, Sussex where he served as a Justice of the peace.

Political career
In November 1928 Jones was selected as prospective Liberal candidate for the West Derby division of Liverpool for the 1929 General Election. The seat had been won by the Liberals in 1923 when there was no Labour candidate. However, his prospects in a three-cornered contest were not good and he finished third, despite increasing the party vote-share;

He did not stand for parliament again.

See also
Probyn-Jones baronets

External links 
The Times Obituary: http://find.galegroup.com/ttda/infomark.do?&source=gale&prodId=TTDA&userGroupName=esusslib&tabID=T003&docPage=article&searchType=BasicSearchForm&docId=CS136400210&type=multipage&contentSet=LTO&version=1.0

References

1892 births
1951 deaths
People educated at Clifton College
Liberal Party (UK) parliamentary candidates
Baronets in the Baronetage of the United Kingdom
Alumni of King's College, Cambridge
Lawyers from Liverpool